The Pointe Nord de Moming (3,863 m) is a mountain of the Swiss Pennine Alps, located west of Täsch in the canton of Valais. It lies on the range between the Weisshorn and the Zinalrothorn, north of the Col de Moming.

See also
Pointe Sud de Moming

References

External links
 Pointe Nord de Moming on Hikr

Mountains of the Alps
Alpine three-thousanders
Mountains of Valais
Mountains of Switzerland
Three-thousanders of Switzerland